The Biddende Maria (Mary in Prayer or Virgin at prayer) is an oil on panel painting by the Flemish renaissance artist Quentin Matsys. The painting was produced in the first decade of the 16th century, probably in 1500. The painting is currently housed at the Royal Museum of Fine Arts in Antwerp. The panel is the interior of the left wing of a diptych with the painting on the other side being a Salvator Mundi.

Painting
The painting depicts Mary at prayer. Her head is covered with a gauze veil upon which rests a crown. There is both softness of brush and softness of rosy hues. Everything in the painting works to give something sweet. In contrast, then, the figure has a stately and austere bearing.

References

1500s paintings
Paintings by Quentin Matsys
Paintings in the collection of the Royal Museum of Fine Arts Antwerp
Paintings of the Virgin Mary